Alpicat is a municipality in the comarca of Segrià and autonomous community of Catalonia, Spain.

Twin Cities
Alpicat's twin city is Dolceacqua, Italy.

References

External links
 Government data pages 

Municipalities in Segrià